The  is a history museum located in Kyoto, Japan. It specializes in the history of the Bakumatsu period and the Meiji Restoration.

The Museum is next to the Kyoto Ryozen Gokoku Shrine.

Notes

External links
 (in Japanese).

Museums in Kyoto
History museums in Japan